Aksel Kuuse (18 September 1913 – 27 April 1942) was an Estonian athlete. He competed in the men's high jump at the 1936 Summer Olympics. He died in prison of war camp in the Soviet Union during World War II.

References

External links
 
 
 

1913 births
1942 deaths
Athletes (track and field) at the 1936 Summer Olympics
Estonian male high jumpers
Olympic athletes of Estonia
People from Märjamaa Parish
Estonian people who died in Soviet detention